Angelo Ranaldo (born 1970) is a Swiss economist. He has been a full professor and chair of finance and systemic risk at the University of St. Gallen in Switzerland since April 2012. He is also the board member Swiss Institute of Banking and Finance and School of Finance at St. Gallen. Before joining the HSG, he served as economic advisor at Swiss National Bank. He holds a Ph.D. (2000) in economics and social science from University of Fribourg (Switzerland). He received both his bachelor and master's degrees in economics and finance from the University L. Bocconi (Italy).

Angelo Ranaldo is the author of numerous research articles and books. His research area includes foreign exchange market, inter bank repo market, derivative market as well as financial and monetary regulations.

Foreign exchange market
Ranaldo has published numerous articles of FX market. Mancini, Ranaldo and Wrampelmeyer (2013) provides the first systematic study of liquidity in the FX market. They find significant variation in liquidity across exchange rates, substantial costs due to FX illiquidity, and strong commonality in the liquidities of different currencies. Fischer and Ranaldo (2008) finds strong evidence that trading volume increases in the order of 5% across currency areas on FOMC days during 2003 to 2007. Karnaukh, Ranaldo and Söderlind (2015) shows FX liquidity can be accurately measured with daily and readily available data and a stronger comovements of FX liquidities in distressed markets, especially when funding is constrained, volatility is high, and FX speculators incur losses. Ranaldo and Söderlind (2010) studies high-frequency exchange rate movements over the sample 1993-2006 and documents that the franc, euro, Japanese yen and the pound tend to appreciate against the U.S. dollar when S&P has negative returns; U.S. bond prices increase and when currency markets become more volatile.

References 

21st-century Swiss economists
Living people
1970 births
Place of birth missing (living people)
Academic staff of the University of St. Gallen
University of Fribourg alumni
Bocconi University alumni